is a Japanese weightlifter. He competed in the men's super heavyweight event at the 2004 Summer Olympics.

References

1975 births
Living people
Japanese male weightlifters
Olympic weightlifters of Japan
Weightlifters at the 2004 Summer Olympics
Place of birth missing (living people)